Ñacunday is a town in the Alto Paraná department of Paraguay. It is known as the location of the Ñacunday National Park with the impressive, approximately 40 m tall and 110 m wide Salto Ñacunday.

Sources 
World Gazeteer: Paraguay – World-Gazetteer.com

Populated places in the Alto Paraná Department